Patrick Maxwell Stewart (1795–1846) was a London merchant and Whig MP for Lancaster (1831–1837) and Renfrewshire (1841–1846).

References

1795 births
1846 deaths
UK MPs 1831–1832
UK MPs 1832–1835
UK MPs 1835–1837
UK MPs 1841–1847
Whig (British political party) MPs for English constituencies
Whig (British political party) MPs for Scottish constituencies